Abergarw is a village in Bridgend county.

Villages in Bridgend County Borough